Battle of Copenhagen may refer to:
 Battle of Copenhagen (1289), between Eric VI of Denmark and Eric II of Norway
 Bombardment of Copenhagen (1428), by ships from six Northern German Hanseatic towns
 Assault on Copenhagen (1659), a major battle during the Second Northern War, taking place during the siege of Copenhagen by the Swedish army.
 Battle of Copenhagen (1801), a naval battle between a British fleet and the Dano-Norwegian Navy
 Battle of Copenhagen (1807), a British bombardment of Copenhagen to capture or destroy the Dano-Norwegian fleet

See also
 2000 UEFA Cup Final riots, a series of riots in City Hall Square, Copenhagen between fans of English football team Arsenal and Turkish side Galatasaray